The 2022–23 Tulane Green Wave men's basketball team represents Tulane University during the 2022–23 NCAA Division I men's basketball season. The Green Wave, led by fourth-year head coach Ron Hunter, play their home games at Devlin Fieldhouse in New Orleans, Louisiana as members of the American Athletic Conference.

Previous season
The Green Wave 14–15, 10–8 in AAC Play to finish in 5th place. They defeated Temple in the quarterfinals of the AAC tournament before losing in the semifinals to Houston.

Offseason

Departures

Incoming Transfers

2022 recruiting class

2023 recruiting class

Roster

Schedule and results

|-
!colspan=12 style=| Exhibition

|-
!colspan=12 style=| Non-conference regular season

|-
!colspan=12 style=| AAC Regular Season

|-
!colspan=12 style=| AAC tournament

Source

References

Tulane Green Wave men's basketball seasons
Tulane
Tulane
Tulane